Ángel Clemente Ávila Romero, known as Ángel Ávila Romero, (Mexico City, July 26, 1980) is a Mexican politician and political scientist graduated from the National Autonomous University of Mexico, current interim President of the Party of the Democratic Revolution. From 2008 to 2011 he was Secretary of Youth Affairs of the National Executive Committee, later he was appointed President of the National Council of the Party of the Democratic Revolution in 2014, a position he left on December 9, 2017 when he was appointed Secretary General of the same party. He was president of the National Executive Committee from October 22 to December 9, 2018, from December 10 a member of the party's Extraordinary National Directorate.

Early years 
From a very young age he began his political career as "PRD Brigadista del Sol" in the campaign to the head of government of the Federal District of Ing. Cuauhtémoc Cárdenas. Later, he was youth coordinator of the national political group "Causa Ciudadana".

He studied a degree in political science at the Faculty of Political and Social Sciences of the National Autonomous University of Mexico, graduating with an honorable mention. During his time at the university, he was a student advisor to his faculty, host of the radio program "Sharing experiences 2000-2003".

Subsequently, he entered fully into the political activities of the PRD as National Leader of Left Youth (2008-2011) and later as private secretary of Jesús Zambrano Grijalva, president of the PRD, between 2011 and 2014.

Political career 
In 2014, he was appointed president of the National Council of the Party of the Democratic Revolution. From this position he had to receive and process the resignation of Agustín Basave from the presidency from the PRD CEN on Jan 11 2016.

The presidency of the National Council left her on December 9, 2017 to become the general secretary of the CEN of the PRD, during the presidency of Manuel Granados Covarrubias. 

His work at the head of the party is to co-implement the 2018 electoral process that begins with the start-up of the coalition "Por México al Frente" formed on December 8 (one day before taking possession of the presidency of the PRD).

Before the resignation of Manuel Granados Covarrubias on October 22, 2018, Ángel Ávila remains as provisional president of the PRD.

References

1980 births
Living people
Mexican political scientists
Party of the Democratic Revolution politicians